The following is a list of female agents who served in the field for the Special Operations Executive (SOE) during World War II. SOE's objectives were to conduct espionage, sabotage and reconnaissance in occupied Europe (and later, also in occupied Southeast Asia) against the Axis powers, and to aid local resistance movements. Most of SOE's female agents worked in France.

In 1981, the official historian of the SOE, Michael R. D. Foot, said that the staff of SOE consisted of about 10,000 men and 3,000 women.  Of that number, "A few highly accomplished and gallant [women] were agents operating in France or Yugoslavia."  Foot cautioned that "On these few there is a large popular literature, almost all of it worthless and much of it about the wrong people."  The declassification of SOE documents beginning in the 1990s permitted more accurate assessments of agents and their accomplishments.

Female SOE F Section agents in France
Estimates of the number of F Section female agents vary. Thirty-nine female SOE agents were trained in Britain. The following list of forty-one agents is taken from M.R.D. Foot, the official historian of the SOE, with two additions: Madeleine Barclay who served (and died) on a ship contracted to SOE and Sonia Olschanezky, a locally-recruited courier who was executed. Of the forty-one SOE F section female agents listed, a few served in France for as much as two years, most for only a few months.  Twenty-five of them survived World War II. Twelve were executed by the Germans, one died when her ship was sunk, two died of disease while imprisoned, and one died of natural causes.  Female agents ranged in age from 20 to 53 years.<ref>Foot, M.R.D. (1966), SOE in France, London: Her Majesty's Stationery Office, pp. 465-469. Estimates of the number of SOE's female agents differ, depending upon who is considered an agent and who was considered a local helper. 39 are listed by Foot, the official historian of the SOE.</ref>

Most SOE agents were sent to France as part of a network or circuit of three persons consisting of an "organiser" who was the leader of the team, a wireless operator, and a courier.  Women were most often employed as couriers as they could travel more easily than men who were regarded with suspicion and might be impressed as labourers.  Pearl Witherington was the only woman to officially head an SOE network in France, although others fulfilled that role on occasion.

In addition to this list of female F Section agents in France, eleven women agents of the RF section of SOE were sent to France in 1944. The RF section was under the direction of  Charles de Gaulle's Free French Government in exile with SOE lending logistical support and financial assistance. Conversely, F section worked with all factions of the French Resistance although leery of assistance to communists.

Source: Foot, M. R. D. (1966), SOE in France,'' London: Her Majesty's Stationery Office, pp. 465–469.

Female SOE agents in other countries

Key

See also
 List of SOE Agents
 SOE F Section networks
 Timeline of SOE's Prosper Network

References

 
Lists of women by occupation
World War II-related lists
Women in war
Ministry of Economic Warfare